USS Norman Scott (DD-690) was a United States Navy  destroyer named for Rear-Admiral Norman Scott (1889–1942), who was killed in the Naval Battle of Guadalcanal and awarded the Medal of Honor.

Norman Scott was laid down 26 April 1943 by Bath Iron Works, Bath, Maine. She was launched 28 August 1943, sponsored by Mrs. Norman Scott, widow of Admiral Scott; and commissioned 5 November 1943.

History
On 14 January 1944, Norman Scott left Boston, escorting the cruiser  to Pearl Harbor, arriving 1 February. Immediately, she served in the Marshall Islands Operations, accompanying the aircraft carrier  to newly-won Majuro. She returned to Pearl Harbor to prepare for the Mariana Islands Operations, during which she escorted heavy bombardment ships as well as conducting fire support missions of her own, during the invasions of Saipan, 15 June, and of Tinian. While firing on Tinian 24 July, during the invasion,  the battleship  came under fire from shore batteries. Norman Scott maneuvered to draw fire away from Colorado, and was hit six times within a few seconds. Norman Scotts captain Seymour Owens and 22 others were killed, with an additional 57 wounded. Temporary repairs were made at Saipan. On 28 July, she sailed for Pearl Harbor and Mare Island Naval Shipyard, where permanent repairs were completed on 21 October. Norman Scott featured in the October 1944 RKO-Pathé film This is America-Navy Yard, about her repairs after being hit at Tinian.

Norman Scott was part of the famed squadron Desron 54 that opened the Battle of Surigao Strait, though she was not present for that action. Norman Scott left Mare Island on 21 October 1944 after her repair to rejoin Desron 54.

Norman Scott trained her new crew in Hawaiian waters, then sailed for Manus. She escorted transports from Manus to the Philippines until 9 February 1945. She then joined the fast carrier task forces of the Fifth and Third Fleets, ranging the western Pacific for strikes which supported the assaults on Iwo Jima and Okinawa. Later in the war, she closed the Japanese home shores as battleships bombarded them. These were the first surface ships to bomb the Japanese homeland.

After supporting the occupation of the Japanese naval base at Yokosuka, Norman Scott returned briefly to Okinawa, then proceeded to the west coast, arriving for Navy Day (27 October) celebrations at Tacoma, Washington. After operating out of San Francisco, she was decommissioned 30 April 1946 and was berthed in reserve at San Diego, moving in 1947 to Mare Island. Norman Scott  was stricken on 15 April 1973. She was sold for scrap on 3 December 1973.

Norman Scott received seven battle stars for World War II service.

References

External links

  navsource.org: USS Norman Scott
 hazegray.org: USS Norman Scott

 

World War II destroyers of the United States
Ships built in Bath, Maine
1943 ships
Fletcher-class destroyers of the United States Navy